The Halieia or Halia was one of the principal festivals celebrated on the island of Rhodes in honour of their patron god Helios, the Sun. It was held every year in summer, with gymnic and musical contests and a great procession.

Name 
The name of the festival derives from Halios, the Doric spelling of Helios' name.

Description 
The festival included games of horse-racing and chariot-racing, gymnastic contests for men and boys, as well as music contests, and a sacrifice. The prize offered for the victors was a wreath of white poplar, a tree which was sacred to the god, due to the brilliance of its shining leaves. According to Festus (s. v. October Equus), the Halieia also included a ritual, that took place on the 24th day of the summer month of Gorpiacus, where the Rhodians sacrificed to the god a team of four white horses, by driving a four-horse chariot, representing the chariot of the sun, into the sea. This ritual symbolised the setting of the sun as it sinks into the sea, and in that way the Rhodians honoured his role as the celestial charioteer. The Halieia drew athletes and musicians from all over the Greek world, and when the Colossus of Rhodes was erected in the harbour, the cult gained even more fame; the festival attracted great athletes from abroad, and victors of games such as the Pythia, the Isthmia and the Nemea found it worthwhile to compete in the Halieia. In the glory days of Rhodes, the neighbouring kingdoms, such as Pergamon in Anatolia, would send envoys to the festival, and it was still flourishing even centuries after that.

In the fictional work Ephesian Tale by Xenophon of Ephesus, the protagonists find themselves at Rhodes during a festival in honour of Helios, described thus:

[T]he next Day was a Festival dedicated to the Sun, and celebrated by the Rhodians, with the utmost publick Magnificence, the Pomp, the Sacrifices, and the Concourse of the Citizens, being exceeding great.Nilsson 1906, p. 427, especially note 4

The protagonist of the story, Anthia, cuts and dedicates some of her hair in Helios' temple with the inscription Anthia dedicated this hair to the god on behalf of Habrokomes.

Connections 
Rituals involving the sacrifice of horses in a similar manner to the sea-god Poseidon Hippios are also attested, and might have influenced the horse-sacrificing rituals to Helios. The Argives drowned horses in Poseidon's honour, in Illyria horses were offered to him every four years in the same manner as during the Halieia, while he was worshipped as Hippios, god of horses, in Lindos, one of the principal Rhodian cities. Scholars have associated these rites, along with those of another Rhodian festival, the Hippokathesia.

See also 

 Ecdysia
 Pandia
 Isthmian games

Notes

References 

 Athenaeus, Deipnosophists, Books 1-9 translated by Charles Burton Gulick (1868-1962), from the Loeb Classical Library edition of 1927-41, books 10- end by Charles Duke Yonge (1812-1891).
 Decharme, Paul, Mythologie de la Grèce antique, Garnier Frères, 1884. Google books (in French).
 
 Farnell, Lewis Richard, The Cults of the Greek States vol. ΙV, Cambridge University Press, 2010, .
 Gardner, Percy; Jevons, Frank Byron, A Manual of Greek Antiquities, University of Wisconsin, 1895, Charles Scribner's Sons.
 
 
 Nilsson, Martin, Griechische Feste von religiöser Bedeutung, mit Ausschluss der attischen, 1906. Internet Archive (in German).
 Parker, Robert, Polytheism and Society at Athens, Oxford University Press, 2005. .
 Seyffert, Oskar, A Dictionary of Classical Antiquities, Mythology, Religion, Literature and Art, from the German of Dr. Oskar Seyffert, S. Sonnenschein, 1901. Internet Archive.
 Smith, William, A Dictionary of Greek and Roman Antiquities. William Wayte. G. E. Marindin. Albemarle Street, London. John Murray. 1890.
 Torr, Cecil, Rhodes in Ancient Times, Cambridge University Press, 1885.
 Xenophon’s Ephesian History: or the Love-Adventures of Abrocomas and Anthia, in Five Books. Translated from the Greek by Mr. Rooke [the Second Edition], London: Printed for J. Millan at Locke’s Head in Shug-Lane; 1727, pp. 87-112.

Festivals in ancient Greece
July observances
Rhodes
Helios
Ancient Greek athletic festivals
Ancient Greek festivals by deity
Greek animal sacrifice
Ancient Greek religion
Ancient Greek festivals by region
Religion in ancient Rhodes
Ancient chariot racing
Horses in religion